The ninth season of the American science fiction television series The X-Files commenced airing in the United States on November 11, 2001, concluded on May 19, 2002, and consists of twenty episodes. The season takes place after Fox Mulder (David Duchovny) goes into hiding, following the events of the eighth season finale, "Existence". As such, the main story arc for the season follows Dana Scully (Gillian Anderson), John Doggett (Robert Patrick), and Monica Reyes (Annabeth Gish) on their hunt to reveal a government conspiracy involving the elaborate and malevolent creation of the "Super Soldiers".

For this season, former series' leads Duchovny and Anderson scaled back their involvement with the show, with Duchovny only starring in the two episodes that formed the season finale, "The Truth". Doggett and Reyes became the show's central characters, and former recurring character Walter Skinner (Mitch Pileggi) became a main character. Series creator Chris Carter had hopes that the show could continue on with new leads, and the opening credits were accordingly redesigned again.

Season nine received mixed reviews by critics and garnered negative reaction from many long-time fans and viewers, partially because Duchovny did not make regular appearances on the show, after fulfilling his contract in the previous season. During this year, ratings for the season fell dramatically. Critics blamed it on what they considered an increasingly incoherent story arc, whilst the cast and crew ascribed the drop in viewership to the September 11 attacks. Regardless, Fox eventually decided to cancel the series.

During the airing of season eight, Carter and The X-Files production team had created and aired a spinoff titled The Lone Gunmen. The show was unsuccessful and was canceled before any story arcs were resolved, but The X-Files episode "Jump the Shark" was written to give closure to the series. The X-Files storyline was continued with the 2008 theatrical film The X Files: I Want to Believe and later with a tenth season in 2016 and an eleventh season in 2018.

Plot overview 

After the eighth season finale "Existence", Fox Mulder (David Duchovny) goes into hiding. Dana Scully (Gillian Anderson) is again reassigned to the FBI Academy, and Monica Reyes (Annabeth Gish) becomes John Doggett's (Robert Patrick) new FBI partner in the X-Files office. Doggett asks Scully for help on a case involving an EPA official, Carl Wormus (Nicholas Walker), who died after his car was forced off a bridge by a woman he picked up. Doggett and Walter Skinner (Mitch Pileggi) travel to a reclamation plant, looking for links between Wormus' work and death. After doing an illegal autopsy on Wormus, Alvin Kersh (James Pickens, Jr.) sends Brad Follmer (Cary Elwes) to locate Doggett. The investigation at the reclamation plant leads to an unknown woman, whose identity is later revealed to be Shannon McMahon (Lucy Lawless), one of Doggett's former Marine associates. She reveals to Doggett that she is a "Super Soldier". This leads them to a clandestine laboratory where a secret experiment is taking place on board on a naval ship. They later find connections between the experiments on the ship and Scully's child, William.

After Scully begins to miss Mulder, a complete stranger—the "Shadow Man" (Terry O'Quinn)—offers his service to drive Mulder out of hiding. Scully takes the offer, but unknowingly gets herself and Mulder in even more danger. The "Shadow Man", who is revealed to be a "Super Soldier" bent on killing Scully and Mulder. After a chase through a quarry, the "Shadow Man" is destroyed after being exposed to magnetite. Later, Scully, Doggett and Reyes find evidence of a dangerous UFO cult which has uncovered a second spacecraft similar to one Scully studied in Africa three years ago. Misled by the FBI, the agents enlist the help of The Lone Gunmen to protect Scully's son after they learn that the cult intends to kill the child. The cult, however, is successful in kidnapping the child. Concurrent with these events, Doggett is run over by a car, which sends him to the hospital. As Follmer and the "Toothpick Man" (Alan Dale) try to uncover the plans of the three agents, Scully and Reyes leave Washington, D.C. to find Scully's son.

Doggett finds a strange disfigured man in the X-Files office; believing he is Mulder, Scully has his DNA tested, and the results reveal him to have the same pattern as Mulder. The disfigured man sticks a needle into William, which the other agents believe to be a virus of some kind, but it is later revealed to be a cure for William's powers. The unnamed man is later revealed to be Jeffrey Spender (Chris Owens), Mulder's half-brother. In the season finale, Mulder returns from hiding in the attempts of finding classified information at an army base. He is caught, however, after allegedly killing an apparently indestructible "Super Soldier", which causes him to be tried before a military tribunal. With the help of Kersh, Scully, Reyes, Doggett, Spender, Marita Covarrubias (Laurie Holden) and Gibson Praise (Jeff Gulka), Mulder breaks out, and Mulder and Scully travel to New Mexico to find an old "wise man", later revealed to be the "Cigarette Smoking Man" (William B. Davis). He tells the two that aliens will begin colonizing the planet on December 22, 2012. Cigarette Smoking Man appears to be killed by a missile, launched under the command of Knowle Rohrer (Adam Baldwin), who is revealed to be alive and well. Mulder and Scully escape, but become fugitives on the run from the FBI. The final scene of the season features the two in a motel room facing an uncertain—but possibly hopeful—future.

Production

Development 

Following the eighth season of The X-Files, David Duchovny announced that he would be completely leaving the show. As such, the future of the show was up in the air. Before greenlighting a ninth season, neither the Fox Network nor any of the Ten Thirteen Productions members knew if creator Chris Carter would return for another season. With this being said, he encouraged the other members of the crew to continue the series without him. Eventually, however, several crew members began to develop new scripts ideas for the ninth season, many of which excited Carter. This new-found enthusiasm eventually caused Carter to sign a contract with Fox for another year. Likewise, Anderson signed on at the last minute, with her contract extension only lasting until the end of 2002; she specifically stated that she would leave the show following the conclusion of the season. Due to the changes in the cast, during the ninth season Doggett and Reyes became the series' new leads. Executive producer Frank Spotnitz speculated that the show could extend into a tenth and possibly eleventh season, if the show was able to attract an audience. However, the show lost viewers and was eventually cancelled by Fox.

With the news of the impending end to the series, the crew members decided to wrap up long-running plots. "Jump the Shark", the final episode to feature the Lone Gunmen, served as a de facto series finale for the cancelled X-Files spin-off series The Lone Gunmen. Executive producer and co-writer Frank Spotnitz had to fight to get the episode made; the studio informed Spotnitz that they did not want to bring the characters back in any capacity, as Fox reportedly "hated [the] characters". Similarly, "Release" was written to create closure to the story of the murder of Doggett's son.

The show's crew and actors had a range of opinions about the show's finale, "The Truth". Carter said of the finale, "It's the end—you don't get another chance. So you'd better put everything you've ever wanted to put in into the episode. There were things to distract from what was going on. The band was breaking up." Gish said, "It did feel like a big movie set. We were on location, there was an enormous budget, and everyone came back." Davis said, "It was great that they brought us all back in the finale, that they found a way to get us all in again." Pileggi said, "I can remember the last day on the set. We shot a scene with Gillian and myself, and that was it. And then I had to say goodbye to another family, another crew. I almost teared up, and Gillian was standing there looking at me saying 'Okay, go ahead, big guy; get through this.' It was tough." Patrick said, "It was pretty euphoric, and sad, and all those emotions you can imagine. A chapter's closing, and we're all moving on to something new and exciting. And yet we were all going to miss each other." Kim Manners called the final scene "truly one of the most emotional experiences I've ever witnessed in my life." Former lead actor Duchovny said, "In some ways, psychically I didn't really leave. It was nice to be able to – I'm just really happy that I was able to come back and finish it."

Casting 

With "Nothing Important Happened Today", the style of the opening credits was changed from the original credits, which, more or less, had been the same for the previous eight seasons. The credits included new graphics as well as new cards for Gish and Pileggi. In addition, Elwes was cast to portray the new recurring character, Brad Follmer, an Assistant Director at the FBI, and Alan Dale was also written into the show as a new "villain", the "Toothpick Man". Lucy Lawless was cast as the intended-recurring character Shannon McMahon, but she became pregnant after filming the season premiere, and—due to her high-risk pregnancy—had to leave the series.

After the departure of Duchovny, the show garnered much criticism by fans and critics alike, with many saying that the bond between Mulder and Scully was what actually kept the show together for the first seven seasons of the show. Realizing his importance in the series, Chris Carter and his crew opened negotiations with Duchovny in the hopes that he would reprise his character for the finale. Initially, they were unsure if he would appear, but he eventually elected to return. Spotnitz said, "My impression from talking to him was that he still cares about the show. He's still invested in it and certainly cares about [Mulder]. And I think he recognized that it was the best thing for the show and the audience [for him] to come back and give closure to nine years of the series." Not only did Duchovny return for the finale, he also returned to write and direct the episode "William"; he even had a small cameo in the episode, appearing as a reflection in Scully's eye. Three episodes later, Duchovny returned as an actor for the season finale, "The Truth".

Crew 
Chris Carter served as executive producer and showrunner for the season and wrote nine episodes, including the two-part season premiere and season finale, as well as important mytharc episodes. Spotnitz continued as executive producer and wrote seven episodes, plus receiving story credit for an additional episode. Vince Gilligan continued as executive producer and wrote three episodes. John Shiban was promoted to executive producer and wrote two episodes, plus receiving story credit for an additional episode. David Amann was promoted to supervising producer and wrote two episodes. Steven Maeda was promoted to executive story editor and wrote two episodes. Former writer for The Lone Gunmen Thomas Schnauz joined the writing staff as a story editor and wrote two episodes. Duchovny received story credit for a single episode.

Manners continued as co-executive producer and directed the most of episodes of the season with eight, including the two-part season finale. Tony Wharmby directed three episodes. Series creator Chris Carter directed two episodes. Co-executive producer Michelle MacLaren and series writer John Shiban each made their directorial debuts, directing one episode. Series writers Frank Spotnitz and Vince Gilligan each directed an episode, after previously directing their first episodes the previous season. The remaining episodes were directed by Dwight Little, Cliff Bole, and cast member David Duchovny.

Cast

Main cast

Starring 
 David Duchovny as Fox Mulder
 Gillian Anderson as Special Agent Dana Scully
 Robert Patrick as Special Agent John Doggett
 Annabeth Gish as Special Agent Monica Reyes
 Mitch Pileggi as Assistant Director Walter Skinner

a  Duchovny is featured in the opening credits for the two-part season finale only. He also has a small uncredited cameo in "William", and appears in archive footage in "Trust No 1" and "Jump the Shark".

b Pileggi is only credited for the episodes he appears in.

Also starring 
 James Pickens, Jr. as Alvin Kersh
 Nicholas Lea as Alex Krycek
 William B. Davis as Cigarette Smoking Man

Recurring cast 
 Cary Elwes as Assistant Director Brad Follmer
 Tom Braidwood as Melvin Frohike
 Bruce Harwood as John Fitzgerald Byers
 Dean Haglund as Richard Langly
 Alan Dale as Toothpick Man

Guest starring

Episodes 

Episodes marked with a double dagger are episodes in the series' Alien Mythology arc.

Reception

Ratings 
The first episode of the season, "Nothing Important Happened Today", gathered 10.6 million viewers, whereas the second part gathered 9.4 million viewers. On May 19, 2002, the series finale, "The Truth", aired, and the Fox Broadcasting Company confirmed that The X-Files was not being renewed for a tenth season. When talking about the beginning of the ninth season, Chris Carter said, "We lost our audience on the first episode. It's like the audience had gone away, and I didn't know how to find them. I didn't want to work to get them back because I believed what we are doing deserved to have them back." "The Truth" received the highest Nielsen household rating and viewership numbers of the season. It earned a 7.5 rating and gathered 13.25 million viewers in the United States. The loss of viewers resulted in this season seeing a 30 percent ratings drop when compared to the eighth season.

Reviews 
Sabadino Parker from PopMatters, when commenting on the series finale, said, "It's also for the good, because The X-Files has long been but a pale reflection of the show it once was." Brian Linder from IGN was more positive to the ninth season, saying that the series could still have aired if the writers created a new storyline for Robert Patrick and Annabeth Gish's character, which The X-Files crew did not do and continued what was seen by many critics as tiresome. Aaron Kinney from Salon magazine was more negative to the new season, even joking about the new female lead, calling her a "peppy new female presence." Entertainment Weekly reviewer Ken Tucker said the show operated in what he called "quaint territory", speculating that Chris Carter was the only one who seemed to understand the complex mytharc. Elizabeth Weinbloom from The New York Times concluded with, "shoddy writing notwithstanding, it was this halfhearted culmination of what was once a beautifully complicated friendship", between Mulder and Scully, ended remaining interest in what was a "waning phenomenon". Another review from The New York Times said of the show, "The most imaginative show on television has finally reached the limits of its imagination." The A.V. Club listed the ninth season and the 2008 film The X-Files: I Want to Believe as the "bad apple" of The X-Files, describing the ninth season as "clumsy mish-mash of stuff that had once worked and new serialized storylines about so-called 'super soldiers'".  M.A. Crang, in his book Denying the Truth: Revisiting The X-Files after 9/11, noted that season nine "does not have a great reputation among viewers". However he argued that the season contains a few "hidden gems" and praised those episodes which dealt with new material, while criticising other entries for focusing too heavily on "plotlines and characters from years gone by".

DVD release

Notes

References

Bibliography

External links 

 Season 9 on TheXFiles.com
 

 
2001 American television seasons
2002 American television seasons
Television shows set in Fairfax County, Virginia